Toy Story is a 1995 computer-animated children's film.

Toy Story may also refer to:
Toy Story (franchise)
Toy Story (soundtrack)
Toy Story (video game)
Toy Story: The Musical (2008–2016)
"Toy Story" (Raising Hope), an episode of Raising Hope
"Toy Story", a song by David Guetta from Nothing but the Beat

See also
James May's Toy Stories, a UK documentary television series
"No Toy Story", an episode of Fanboy & Chum Chum